Ovieda is a genus of flowering plant in the family Lamiaceae, first described for modern science in 1753. It contains only one known species, Ovieda spinosa , endemic to the Island of Hispaniola in the West Indies.

References

Lamiaceae
Monotypic Lamiaceae genera
Taxa named by Carl Linnaeus